Maxime Legault (born March 28, 1989) is a Canadian ice hockey player who is currently playing for the Gothiques d'Amiens in the French Ligue Magnus. He was originally selected by the Buffalo Sabres in the seventh round (194th overall) of the 2009 NHL Entry Draft.

Playing career
On Oct. 10, 2009, Legault made his professional debut with the Portland Pirates, but appeared in only five games during the 2009–10 season for the AHL team before being returned to  the Cape Breton Screaming Eagles of the Quebec Major Junior Hockey League. Legault played the full 2010–11 season in the AHL, getting into 67 regular season games and 9 playoff games with the Pirates.

On August 2, 2011, the Buffalo Sabres announced that Legault was re-signed to a two-year AHL contract with the  Rochester Americans.

After playing with the Americans, he joined the Gwinnett Gladiators in the ECHL for the 2013–14 season.

On May 30, 2016, Legault left North America as a free agent and opted for a second stint in Europe, agreeing to a one-year deal with French Ligue Magnus outfit, Gothiques d'Amiens.

Career statistics

References

External links

1989 births
Living people
Buffalo Sabres draft picks
Canadian ice hockey defencemen
Cape Breton Screaming Eagles players
Gwinnett Gladiators players
Lausitzer Füchse players
Norfolk Admirals (ECHL) players
Portland Pirates players
Rochester Americans players
Shawinigan Cataractes players
Canadian expatriate ice hockey players in Germany